The 2018 European Archery Championships is  the 25th edition of the European Archery Championships. The event was held in Legnica, Poland from 27 August to 1 September 2018.

Medal summary

Recurve

Source:

Compound

Source:

Medal table

References

External links
Official site
Results book

European Archery Championships
2018 in archery
2018 in Polish sport
International sports competitions hosted by Poland
Archery competitions in Poland
European Archery Championships
European Archery Championships
2018 in European sport